Neville Thomas (born 18 January 1934) is a Guyanese cricketer. He played in five first-class matches for British Guiana in 1953/54 and 1954/55.

See also
 List of Guyanese representative cricketers

References

External links
 

1934 births
Living people
Guyanese cricketers
Guyana cricketers